1-Amino-5-phosphonoindan-1-carboxylic acid (APICA) is a drug that is used in neuroscience research. It is a selective antagonist for the group II metabotropic glutamate receptors (mGluR2/3), and has been useful in the study of this receptor subfamily.

References 

1-Aminoindanes
MGlu2 receptor antagonists
MGlu3 receptor antagonists